is a Japanese professional footballer who plays as a winger for J1 League club Sagan Tosu.

Career
Yoichi Naganuma joined J1 League club Sanfrecce Hiroshima in 2016. On March 15, 2017, he debuted in J.League Cup (v Ventforet Kofu).

In July 2022, Naganuma transferred to Sagan Tosu.

Club statistics
.

References

External links

Profile at Sanfrecce Hiroshima

1997 births
Living people
Association football people from Yamanashi Prefecture
Japanese footballers
J1 League players
J2 League players
Sanfrecce Hiroshima players
Montedio Yamagata players
FC Gifu players
Ehime FC players
Sagan Tosu players
Association football midfielders
Footballers at the 2018 Asian Games
Asian Games silver medalists for Japan
Asian Games medalists in football
Medalists at the 2018 Asian Games